Petty is an unincorporated community located in Mitchell County, Georgia, United States.

Geography
Petty's latitude is at 	31.178517 and its longitude is at -84.1679591. Petty lies at the end of Ironweed Road. Mayhaw Lane, Midway Road, Back 9 Road, Old Georgia Highway/Route 3, Hog Haw Road, Mount Zion Church Road, Microwave Road, and US Route 19 run through the area. Howell Lake is the area's primary water source.

Churches
Pleasant View Missionary Baptist Church is the area's church.

Demographics
As of 2011 Petty is a small farming community.

Civil 
Petty sports many abandoned houses (one being on Mayhaw Lane). It also has a plant that employs many of the town's residents. Fritz Horse Farm is one of the town's farms. The town was settled on a railroad crossing which rests at the end of Ironweed Road.

Cemeteries 
Pinecrest Memory Gardens is the town's cemetery.

References

Unincorporated communities in Georgia (U.S. state)
Unincorporated communities in Mitchell County, Georgia